The "Friday night death slot" or "Friday evening death slot" is a perceived graveyard slot in American television. It implies a television program in the United States scheduled on Friday evenings (typically, between 8:00 and 11:00 p.m. ET) is likely to be canceled.

The term possibly began as a reflection of certain programs' dominance of Friday night in the 1980s and 1990s, which resulted in decreased ratings for those scheduled opposite their competitors.<ref name="voorhees">John Voorhees. "ABC reshuffles schedule for ratings but deals only two new shows," The Seattle Times, December 13, 1985, page C5: "Also being dropped is Our Family Honor, the ABC series that has had the distinction of being the lowest-rated Nielsen show almost every week since its debut. It is in the Friday night death slot of 10 pm, against Miami Vice and Falcon Crest.''</ref> By the 2000s, it was used in reference to the belief that young, single Americans rarely watch television on Friday or Saturday nights, thereby removing from the household what is considered the most lucrative demographic for advertisers. With the collapse of the traditional network viewing model where viewers had to be in front of the TV to watch shows (and then the evolution from VCR or DVR capabilities to almost all shows being viewed increasingly through on-demand streaming media), the stigma of Friday night scheduling is much less evident or considered today than in the past.

Programs affected by the "death slot"

 NBC 
One of the earliest and most famous examples of the "Friday Night Death Slot" phenomenon was the original Star Trek on NBC.

The second season of Star Trek aired on Fridays from 8:30–9:30 p.m. (Eastern Time). Although NBC discussed plans to move it to a 7:30–8:30 p.m. slot on Mondays for mid-season, that never occurred. The poor ratings in the time slot affected the show after it, Jerry Van Dyke's sitcom Accidental Family, leading to its failure after less than a season and angering Van Dyke, who was desperate for a hit and openly (but unsuccessfully) campaigned for NBC to give the show a better time slot. After Star Trek fans deluged NBC with a mail-in protest, producer Gene Roddenberry stated that he was promised the same 8:30–9:30 time slot for Season 3, but airing on Monday instead of Friday. However, that would have meant Rowan & Martin's Laugh-In had to start a half-hour later (moving from 9:00 to 9:30). Laugh-In producer George Schlatter saw no reason why his show, which was a ratings smash at the time, had to yield its slot to the poorly rated Star Trek, and he made no secret of his displeasure. Star Trek instead remained on Fridays, moving to the even less desirable 10:00 p.m. timeslot (one that had been used mainly for filler and throwaway documentaries the previous season). Lamented Roddenberry, "If the network wants to kill us, it couldn't make a better move."

The following are examples of NBC shows that started on Friday nights and lasted for a few episodes, or were moved to Friday nights, lost the battle for television ratings, and were eventually canceled:

CBS
CBS was the most successful network on Friday nights in the 1980s due to their hit shows Dallas and Falcon Crest, but both shows were struggling by the end of the decade and were cancelled in the early 1990s. In an effort to revive Friday night television in the 1990s, and to compete with ABC's successful TGIF block of family comedies airing opposite it, CBS first attempted to compete with ABC launching a comedy night in the fall of 1992 with The Golden Palace (a spin-off/continuation of NBC's The Golden Girls), Major Dad and Designing Women, along with a new sitcom from Bob Newhart, Bob. The Golden Girls had been a top-10 hit on Saturday nights for NBC (though it had fallen to 30th in its final season), while Major Dad and Designing Women had also been top-10 hits on Monday nights, and Newhart's previous sitcom, Newhart, had spent most of its run in the top 30. Nevertheless, this effort failed, and only Bob was renewed for the 1993–1994 season, only to end in December 1993. A later effort to counterprogram TGIF, the CBS Block Party (which included former TGIF series Family Matters and Step by Step, both of which were hits for several years while on ABC before both shows were canceled in 1997), met a similar fate in the fall of 1997.

In 2013, CBS moved Vegas to Friday nights to make room for Golden Boy, another police drama. Both shows were eventually cancelled during their first year.

In general, however, CBS has found ways, particularly in the years following the cancellation of the Block Party, to be at least somewhat more successful in the Friday night time slots than its broadcast competitors.Friday Night 'Numb3rs' Favor CBS. Zap2It: November 10, 2007

The following are all examples of CBS shows that either started on Friday nights and lasted a few episodes, or moved to Friday nights, lost the battle for television ratings, and were eventually cancelled:

CBS has aired MacGyver, Hawaii Five-0 and Blue Bloods in that order on Friday night between 2016 and 2020.

ABC
TGIF was a successful block for ABC, which ran from 1989 to 2000 (although the network had been running a sitcom block on Fridays beginning in 1987); it focused primarily on family-friendly sitcoms. The network had also had success with a block featuring The Partridge Family and The Brady Bunch in the same time slots during the early 1970s. Following the slow collapse of TGIF in the late 1990s, Friday night has fallen into a lower priority for the network. The following are examples of ABC network shows that started on Friday nights and lasted a few episodes, or were moved to Friday nights, lost the battle for television ratings, and were eventually canceled:

In September 2018, ABC cleared the 9:00 p.m. Eastern time slot on Friday nights to make room for the expansion of 20/20 to two hours as a result of ABC News changing the program's format to include true crime stories in an attempt to address the program's declining viewership.

Fox
Perhaps the network which has received the most attention and has become the most well known for the "Friday Night Death Slot" has been Fox.

The following are all examples of Fox shows that either started on Friday nights and lasted only a few episodes, or were moved to Friday nights, suffered from dismal ratings, and were eventually canceled.

In January 2011, the sci-fi drama Fringe, then in its third season, was moved into this slot from Thursdays. According to Fox Entertainment President Kevin Reilly, nearly half of Fringes viewership time shifts the show to watch at their convenience, and that "if it does anywhere near what it did on Thursdays, we can glue that show to the schedule because it can be a big win for us". The Fox network created a promotional advertisement for Fringe that lampooned its reputation of the Friday night death slot prior to Fringes move. Despite encountering lower ratings after its move, Fringe was renewed for a fourth season, and later for a shortened final fifth season to allow the creators to complete the story arc they had set out at the start of the program as well as to reach 100 episodes, allowing the show to be resold in syndication. Critics praised Fox for taking the risk and profit lost on the show to satisfy the creators' desires and fans' requests to complete the show's primary story. The series finale aired on January 18, 2013.

After 20 years of unsuccessfully trying to find programming to fill the Friday night death slot, Fox gave up, leaving a one-hour empty hole on that night in the 9:00 p.m. (Eastern Time) hour for the 2013–14 schedule. Encores of Fox programming from the previous week originally aired in that timeslot. However, in November 2012, in the hopes of revitalizing Fox's Friday ratings, the sitcom Raising Hope moved from Tuesdays to Fridays for its fourth season, airing in the 9 p.m. half-hour; the freshman sitcom, Enlisted premiered in the 9:30 p.m. slot before both series swapped timeslots in late January. This "encore slot" was made a permanent part of the schedule for the 2014–15 season. Fox did not include such a slot in 2015–16, but the show chosen to fill the 9:00 p.m. time slot was the low-budget panel game World's Funniest Fails.

In October 2019, Fox cleared its Friday night time slots to make way for WWE SmackDown, which was expected to air on the network until 2024.

 The WB 

Other networksWWF SmackDown! was first broadcast on UPN on Thursdays to compete with WCW Thunder (eventually forcing Thunder to Wednesdays because of high ratings for SmackDown!, before a majority of the assets belonging to WCW were ultimately purchased by Vince McMahon in 2001). UPN moved the show to Friday nights in the United States on September 9, 2005, because of low ratings in its original Thursday night slot, and the show retained its Friday night time slot after moving to The CW in September 2006. Upon its move to the "death slot," UPN/The CW Friday nights saw a substantial increase in ratings over UPN's movies and most of The WB's sitcoms. SmackDown! had also initially garnered even better ratings in the death slot than the ratings on its former Thursday night airings (after WCW was bought by the WWF in 2001). Despite this, The CW chose not to renew SmackDowns contract in 2008 due to the change of the demographic of the network's viewers (shifting more towards women 12–34 years of age), and the show moved to MyNetworkTV that fall, eventually leaving network television altogether with a move to Syfy in 2010. SmackDown then moved to the USA Network in 2016, thus sharing the same network as WWE's flagship show, Raw. As previously noted, the show moved to Fox and return to Friday nights in 2019.

UPN also moved Star Trek: Enterprise to Friday nights at the start of its fourth and final season in 2004. UPN was subject to heavy sports pre-emptions by local affiliates on Friday nights in the Major League Baseball, high school football, and NHL/NBA seasons, pushing it to late night. A good number of viewers thus chose to watch the show's weekend repeat whenever it was offered by their UPN affiliate, though the network and the show's Internet fanbase heavily discouraged watching it, as it was an unrated airing by Nielsen.

In recent years on The CW, Cedric's Barber Battle fell victim to the Friday night death slot, only airing 8 episodes out of the 10 produced before being pulled off the schedule completely.

Exceptions

Despite its reputation, Friday night prime time has also seen numerous successful series run for multiple years. The aforementioned Dallas rated in the Top 10 of the Nielsen ratings for seven consecutive seasons and was the top-rated series for three of those seasons. It had also aired the all-time most watched non-series finale single U.S. television episode (in the 1980 resolution episode of the internationally prominent Who Shot J.R. cliffhanger). The Dukes of Hazzard, which preceded Dallas on Friday nights from 1979 to 1985, was rated in the Top 20 in the Nielsen ratings during its first four seasons before falling in the ratings in its fifth (the season in which series stars John Schneider and Tom Wopat left due to their salaries and merchandising royalties), sixth, and seventh seasons. The Incredible Hulk, which aired on Friday nights during most of its run, went for five seasons to decent success in the ratings before being abruptly and controversially cancelled midway through its fifth season. In the 1990s, two shows that found a lot of success on Friday nights were Fox's The X-Files and NBC's Homicide: Life on the Street. The former show did so well on Fridays that it became an attractive option for the network to try and move past an all-comedy Sunday night lineup when it made the move to 9PM EST in 1996 (and did well for several years afterwards), while the latter was mainly placed on Friday nights because NBC's dominant 1990s lineup simply had no place for the show on any other prime one-hour spot (it was considered for the Thursday 10PM EST spot heading into the 1994–95 season, but the network decided to go with ER there instead).Falcon Crest, which aired after Dallas from 1981 to 1990, went for nine seasons with successful ratings, reaching the Top 25 in the Nielsen ratings in its first six seasons before dropping in the ratings in its final three seasons. In the 1970s, NBC's Sanford and Son managed to crack the Top 10 throughout its run except in its final season, despite airing its entire run on Friday nights. The Rockford Files, which only cracked the Top 30 in its first season, ran for six seasons on NBC on Friday nights and received critical acclaim by being nominated for eighteen Emmys, winning five. During the 1980s, NBC aired the popular police drama Miami Vice on Friday nights for five seasons. Its popularity was due to the show's fashions, pastel colors, expensive cars, and incorporation of various popular songs of that era in the show, which resonated with younger fans who were really into images that they had seen on MTV at the time. Annual telecasts of the movie The Wizard of Oz were aired by CBS on Friday nights beginning in 1979 with success after many years of Sunday evening airings.

ABC branded the evening TGIF and, for many years, scheduled a number of long-running sitcoms that evening, such as Perfect Strangers, Full House, Family Matters, Boy Meets World and Sabrina, the Teenage Witch. Prior to TGIF in 1989, ABC had sitcoms that were successful on Friday nights such as Benson, Webster, and Mr. Belvedere. During the early 1970s, ABC had a successful Friday-night comedy lineup with The Brady Bunch, The Partridge Family, Room 222, Love, American Style and The Odd Couple. More recently,  Last Man Standing enjoyed a six-season run on ABC with the last five seasons airing on Friday nights. The show remained on Friday nights in 2018 after switching networks to Fox. Law and Order: Special Victims Unit developed a large and loyal audience on NBC on Friday nights when it was moved there from Mondays in the middle of the first season in January 2000. SVU remained on Fridays through the second, third and fourth seasons before moving to Tuesdays in season five in September 2003. Now airing on Thursdays, SVU is in its 23rd season . Following SVU on NBC, another wildly successful show, The Blacklist, took up the death slot for nearly 8 full seasons before being moved to a Wednesday 10/9c schedule in the middle of 2021.

More recently, the CBS fantasy series Ghost Whisperer enjoyed a successful five-season run on Friday nights, as did the light crime thriller Numb3rs, which ran for six, and The Unit, which ran for four. Later shows Hawaii Five-0, Magnum P.I. and Blue Bloods also fared well, though they admittedly appealed to older audiences who were more likely to stay home on Friday nights (CBS in and of itself typically targets a slightly older key demographic than its competitors). From 2014 to 2016, the long-running reality TV series The Amazing Race moved from Sunday to Friday nights. The Amazing Race moved out of its Friday schedule for the 29th season and now aired on Thursdays, .

The CW show Supernatural was moved to Friday for its sixth and seventh seasons, allegedly to test its true drawing power compared to the station's glitzier drama shows. Many fans, knowing about the 'death slot', feared that this meant it was on its way to being cancelled, but it actually increased in viewership. This led to the network moving it back into mid-week scheduling, eventually back to its original WB slot, Tuesdays. In 2015, midseason, the show was moved to Wednesday evenings, where it had also aired. For a majority of the show's run, the program was scheduled on Thursdays, Mondays being the only weekday it was not aired on, and it has maintained its audience in all time slots. The network's own iterations of Whose Line is it Anyway? and Penn & Teller: Fool Us have survived the Friday slot for multiple years.

A general exception to the "death slot" is in regards to children's television. Disney Channel and Cartoon Network have long experienced success on Friday nights with their respective children's program blocks. Cartoon Network's original programming success on this night began in 1999 with the launch of Cartoon Cartoon Fridays (later known as simply Fridays), a two-hour block of original animated series during primetime that included series such as Dexter's Laboratory, The Powerpuff Girls, Cow & Chicken, Johnny Bravo, Samurai Jack, Foster's Home for Imaginary Friends, and Camp Lazlo. After the block was discontinued in 2007, Cartoon Network shifted its programming towards more action-oriented series such as Star Wars: The Clone Wars and Ben 10 in the Friday primetime slot. Disney Channel did not begin airing original programming on Friday evenings until 2001; premieres of its made-for-cable films moved to that night from Saturdays that year. This was followed by its original series in 2007 (which had aired during the two hours preceding the designated "death slot" period); since then, Disney Channel has been successful with its original programming on that night (which have included popular series such as Hannah Montana, Wizards of Waverly Place, Jessie, Girl Meets World and The Suite Life on Deck – the latter of which was the number one series among children between the ages of 6 and 12 years in 2008). Its original movies have also generally performed well on Friday nights; in particular, the August 17, 2007 premiere of High School Musical 2'' was the channel's highest-rated made-for-cable film to date, and holds the Nielsen record for the highest-rated made-for-cable movie premiere and the highest-rated non-sports program in the history of basic cable, watched by 17.2 million viewers.

See also
Dump months, the equivalent of the Friday night death slot in the annual North American movie calendar

References

Further reading 

Television terminology
Market research
Night death slot